Thomas Hislop may refer to:
Sir Thomas Hislop, 1st Baronet (1764–1843), British Army general
Thomas William Hislop (1850–1925), mayor of Wellington, New Zealand
Thomas Hislop (mayor) (1888–1965), son of Thomas William Hislop, also mayor of Wellington, New Zealand
Tom Hislop (born 1988), Australian rules footballer